Kim Won-jun (born February 16, 1973), also known as Dearro, is a South Korean pop singer and actor. After graduating from the film department of Seoul Institute of the Arts, Kim began his career as a K-pop solo artist in 1992, and made his acting debut in 1994. As a solo artist, Kim released nine albums, four digital singles, and one compilation album. He was also a member of the bands V.E.I.L (which released two albums and one EP) and M4 (which released one album and two EPs).

As an actor, Kim has starred in both television dramas (such as My Husband Got a Family) and musical theatre.

In 2011, he appeared on the third season of reality show We Got Married, where he was paired with actress Park So-hyun.

Kim also works as a professor of applied music at Soongsil University, Daegu Arts University and Gangdong College (in Eumseong County).

In 2016, he married a lawyer.

Discography

Solo artist

Album
[1992] 모두 잠든 후에 (In the Dead of the Night )
[1993] 나에게 떠나는 여행 (Journey for Myself)
[1994] 너 없는 동안 (While You Were Not Here)
[1995] Dear
[1996] Best Album
[1996] Show
[1997] One
[1998] Self Destruction
[2000] Another 8000
[2001] Dearro Nine

Digital single
[2009] 나스럽게 ("Like Myself")
[2011] 니가 뭔데 ("Who Do You Think You Are?"; insert song in We Got Married)
[2012] 러브콜 ("Love Call")
[2012] "Crazy" (from My Husband Got a Family OST)

Featured artist
[1994] 세상은 나에게 ("The World Is to Me"; track from The Blue Sky OST)
[2000] "Hellow" (track from RNA OST)
[2000] "Turn" (track from RNA OST)
[2002] 내 사랑 울보 ("My Love Crybaby"; track from Legend: Jeon Young-rok 30th Anniversary Tribute Album)
[2006] "Finale" (duet with Park Hye-kyung in her album Yesterday)
[2012] "Crazy" (duet with Park Mi-kyung in My Husband Got a Family OST)
[2012] "Don't Stop the Music" (track from My Husband Got a Family OST)

V.E.I.L
[2006] V.E.I.L
[2007] Lesson 01
[2008] 1.5 Lesson Completed

M4
[2011] The Sto.ry of M4
[2012] 2nd Mini Album

Filmography

Television series
The Blue Sky (KBS2, 1995)
RNA (KBS2, 2000)
Scent of a Man (MBC, 2003)
Garden of Eve (SBS, 2003)
Drama City "Spaghetti Dating" (KBS2, 2005)
Stormy Lovers (MBC, 2010)
The Wedding Scheme (tvN, 2012)
My Husband Got a Family (KBS2, 2012)
My Love from the Star (SBS, 2013) (cameo, ep 21)

Film
Sun of Fire  (1994)
Sunset on the Neon Lights (1995) (cameo)
Baby Alone (2002) (cameo)
Bewitching Attraction (2006)

Variety show
TV Gayo 20 (SBS, 1994)
Radio Star (MBC, 2008/2010)
Fervent Force (MBC Every 1, 2010)
We Got Married Season 3 (MBC, 2011)
Top Magic (Channel A, 2012)
The Last Audition of My Life (KBS2, 2012–2013)
Let's Go World – Alaska (MBC, 2013)
Law of the Jungle in Savanna (SBS, 2013)
Running Man (Episode 232)Infinite Challenge (Episode 390)

Musical theatre
Radio Star (2008)
Jack the Ripper (2009)
Radio Star (2010)
Sherlock Holmes (2011)
Sherlock Holmes and the Secret Weapon (2012)
Rock of Ages (2012–2013)
Healing Heart Season 3: The Man with Many Tails (2013)

Radio program
FM Inkigayo (KBS 2FM)
Kim Won-jun's Magic in the World

References

External links

1973 births
K-pop singers
South Korean male film actors
South Korean male television actors
Living people
21st-century South Korean male  singers